Jean Marcadé  (27 April 1920 – 28 December 2012) was a French hellenist historian. He was a member of the Institut de France.

Biography 
A student at the École normale supérieure (1939), Jean Marcadé was agrégé of classical letters then became a member of the French School at Athens (1946–1950 and 1951–1953).

He began his career at the Faculty of Arts of the University of Bordeaux, where he was a lecturer and then, having defended his thesis in 1969, professor of classical archeology and history of antique art (1953–1978). He also headed a research center until 1989. From 1971, however, he led a seminar at the université Paris-1 Panthéon-Sorbonne, where he was finally elected a professor of classical archeology (1978).

He was elected a corresponding member of the Académie des inscriptions et belles-lettres in 1978 then full member on 25 February 1983 at Claude Schaeffer's seat and presided the Académie in 1994.

References

External links 
 In memoriam Jean Marcadé (1920-2012)
 Journée d’hommage à Jean Marcadé
 Hommage à Jean Marcadé

People from Libourne
1920 births
2012 deaths
École Normale Supérieure alumni
20th-century French historians
French hellenists
Members of the Académie des Inscriptions et Belles-Lettres
Members of the French School at Athens
Chevaliers of the Légion d'honneur
Commanders of the Ordre national du Mérite
Commandeurs of the Ordre des Palmes Académiques
Officiers of the Ordre des Arts et des Lettres
French expatriates in Greece